Alpha Industries is an American clothing manufacturer founded in 1959 in Knoxville, Tennessee and specialises in American military style and fashion apparel. Alpha makes items such as flight jackets and vests, and has made jackets for the military of the United States like the M65 Jacket for over half a century.

History

Superior Togs Corporation
Alpha Industries has its roots in a family of companies comprising Superior Togs Corporation, Rolen Sportswear and Dobbs Industries. Through the 1940s, these companies were linked by common ownership and an identical business of manufacturing flight jackets for the United States military. 

In January 1948, Robert Lane and his wife Helen incorporated Superior Togs Corporation in order to manufacture flight jackets on a United States Department of Defense contract.

In 1952, Superior Togs Corporation was shut down when the government suspended the contract. Robert Lane set up a new company called Rolen Sportswear, an equivalent of Superior Togs under a different name. They picked up the same United States Department of Defense (DOD) contracts and used the same Elizabeth, New Jersey factory.

By 1957, Robert Lane created Dobbs Industries in Knoxville, Tennessee where labor was plentiful and manufacturing costs were substantially less.

Creation of Alpha Industries
Robert Lane was accused in 1959 of bribing a government official for a Department of Defense contract. As such his business and any business associated with him were barred from ever obtaining another contract from the government. Although he held 90% of the shares to Dobb Industries, this still spelled the end for Samuel Gelber, Lane's accountant, who split with Lane and approached Herman "Breezy" Wynn, founder of Wynn Industries Group who is credited for the early success of Alpha Industries. Because of his knowledge of the textile industry and because of his numerous resources, Mr. Herman “Breezy” Wynn allowed Alpha Industries to grow from its humble beginnings. On October 17, 1959, Gelber incorporated his new company, Alpha Industries, in Knoxville, Tennessee.

Alpha Industries began operations making military clothing in the basement of a rented Knoxville factory using leased sewing machines and only a few employees. Department of Defense contracts were initially difficult to secure in a time of peace, however, the start of the Vietnam War meant a sudden increase in demand for military clothing and Alpha's growth rapidly accelerated.

In 1963, Alpha Industries started to produce the MA-1 bomber jacket.

Vietnam War
Due to the unusual nature of manufacturers who worked by government contract the multiple companies were persuaded to work collaboratively through subcontracts and affiliations, which was known as the Wynn Confederation. It was a series of DOD contract manufactures who would lease sewing machinery to other companies within the Confederation, provide them with technical assistance, and provide and train employees. Wynn would also locate the fabric and component suppliers for the Confederation groups. This subcontracting made it possible for fledgling groups like Alpha to acquire work and survive past its first 12 months of existence.

With America's escalating involvement in Vietnam starting in the 1960s, companies like Alpha found themselves inundated with work. Alpha expanded considerably over the decade and soon occupied all four floors of the 614 11th Street factory. The government's demand for quality control brought John Niethammer in who became a significant player to Alpha's expansion..

When the Vietnam War ended, Alpha made the rounds through army surplus stores. The only changes Alpha would make over the next 20 years for the public market were in the color of the jackets.

In 1970, Alpha Industries started to cater to the consumer market. In the 1970s, the Department of Defense deemed it necessary to equip every man with separate clothing for every possible weather scenario they could encounter. This meant a busy period for manufacturers like Alpha. Because DOD contracts were given preferably to small companies, Alpha did not want to risk increasing its employment to more than 500 workers, so new subcontracting groups were created, like Summit Apparel and Benton Manufacturing. With a move to a larger factory in 1980, Alpha was able to devote whole buildings to single types of jackets. The new factory saw the production of 550,000 field jackets per year.

End of Cold War

Alpha soon began to sell commercially. By this time Alpha had dabbled in commercial sales in between DOD contracts through subcontracted groups such as Dobbs Apparel. 

In 1982, Samuel Gelber died at the age of 67 and left the company to his wife Mildred with the assistance of John Niethammer and her son-in-law Alan Cirker. The new management expanded the commercial side of its business.

The Reagan administration called for an increase in DOD spending which exceeded 1.8 billion dollars in textile alone. Alpha became the leading producer of the new CWU 36/P and 45/P Nomex flight jackets which replaced the MA-1 bomber jacket, and the Gore-Tex systems which replaced the parkas.

By the mid-1980s Alpha found that some of their products were envied by foreign military groups and were recommended to military attachés by the United States Defense Logistics Agency (DLA). In deals that required foreign groups to purchase through American manufacturers Alpha found itself with new customer bases in other countries.

The end of the Cold War brought the Peace Dividend and by the early 1990s, DOD spending had decreased by 75%. Liberalization of trade barriers and a reduction of duties also led to a breakdown in the American apparel industry. Those factors highly threatened to end Alpha Industries. The Gulf War and Iraq War did not noticeably increase the demand for military apparel. The military's focus became on technology and electronics that would reduce the use of human life. Therefore, Alpha turned more and more to the commercial sale of its products.

Fashion brand
Alpha Industries is now a manufacturer of military style apparel with customers ranging from U.S. surplus to stores across Europe and Asia. Alpha now creates replicas of famous military wear as well as casual clothing that is military-inspired. Children's clothing and accessories are also made by Alpha Industries.

In 1992, the brand switched to the flying A logo to adapt to the internationalization of their sales. During the latter decades of the 20th century Alpha produced clothing for military organizations throughout the world including Argentina, Australia, Belgium, Chile, Ecuador, The Netherlands, Jordan, New Guinea, Saudi Arabia, Singapore, Taiwan, and Uruguay.

Alpha has expanded into networks of international distributors, retailers, and internet sellers. Supplementing its small American factory base (still located in Knoxville), Alpha has expanded its range of manufacturing outside of the United States. Much of their product is made in China.

In 2008, Alpha Industries started to partner with other clothing brands to release new lines of products.

In 2011, Michael Cirker replaced his father as CEO of Alpha Industries. While the father Alan had focused on international distribution, the son Michael turned Alpha into a fashion brand.

Partnership 
In October 2020, Alpha Industries partnered with A Bathing Ape. The partnership features all the garments to dual branding of patchwork, embroidery and other streetwear textures.

References

External links 
 

Clothing companies of the United States
Clothing manufacturers
High fashion brands
Companies based in Fairfax County, Virginia
American companies established in 1959
Clothing companies established in 1959
1959 establishments in Virginia